The Friedrichshafen FF.54 was a German experimental quadruplane that was developed by Flugzeugbau Friedrichshafen during the First World War.

Design and development
It was equipped with a 160 hp Mercedes D.IIIa in-line engine.  The armament consisted of two LMG 08/15 machine guns that fired through the propeller.  The first flight took place on October 31, 1917.  The aircraft crashed on the first flight.  It was later rebuilt as a triplane, with the second wing from the top removed.  The improved version was flown in May 1918, and crashed again. As a result, the project was discontinued in September 1918.

Specifications

References

Bibliography

1910s German experimental aircraft
Quadruplanes
Aircraft first flown in 1917
Single-engined tractor aircraft